The Hanshin Tigers (Japanese: 阪神タイガース Hanshin Taigāsu) are a Nippon Professional Baseball team playing in the Central League.  The team is based in Nishinomiya, Hyōgo Prefecture, Japan, and is owned by Hanshin Electric Railway Co., Ltd., a subsidiary of Hankyu Hanshin Holdings Inc.

The Hanshin Tigers are one of the oldest professional clubs in Japan.  They played their first season in 1936 as the Osaka Tigers and assumed their current team name in 1961.

History

The Hanshin Tigers, second of the oldest professional clubs in Japan, were founded on December 10, 1935, with the team being formed in 1936. The team was first called "Ōsaka Tigers". In 1940, amid anti-foreign sentiment and the Tojo government's ban on English nicknames, the Tigers changed the name to simply "Hanshin". In 1947, the team reverted back to "Ōsaka Tigers" after the JPBL mandated English nicknames. The current team name was assumed in 1961, due to the team playing in the suburb of Nishinomiya, which is not in Osaka Prefecture.

The Tigers won four titles before the establishment of the two league system in 1950. Since the league was split into the Central League and the Pacific League, the Tigers have won the Central League pennant five times (1962, 1964, 1985, 2003, 2005) and the Japan Series once (1985).

When the 2004 Major League Baseball season opened in Japan, the Tigers played an exhibition game against the New York Yankees at the Tokyo Dome on March 29.  The Tigers won 11–7.

In each of 2005, 2006, 2007 and 2009, more than three million people attended games hosted by the Tigers.  The Tigers were the only one of the 12 Nippon Professional Baseball teams to achieve this.

On January 31, 2007, the Tigers presented uniforms for the 2007 season.  For the home uniforms, yellow, one of the colors of the team, was used again.

The home field, Koshien Stadium, is used by high school baseball teams from all over Japan for play in the national championship tournaments in spring and summer. The summer tournament takes place in the middle of the Tigers' season, forcing the Tigers to go on a road trip and play their home games at Kyocera Dome Osaka. Fans call this "The Road of Death".

Famous players in Hanshin Tigers history include Fumio Fujimura, Masaru Kageura, Minoru Murayama, Yutaka Enatsu, Masayuki Kakefu, Randy Bass, Taira Fujita, and many others.

Koshien Stadium
The home field of the Tigers, Hanshin Koshien Stadium, is one of three major natural grass baseball stadiums in Japan. The others are the Mazda Zoom-Zoom Stadium Hiroshima (Hiroshima Toyo Carp), and Hotto Motto Field Kobe (part-time home of the Orix Buffaloes). Of the three, only Koshien has an all-dirt infield (the other two have an American-style infield). There are numerous smaller grass field ballparks around the country; Japanese baseball teams frequently play games in small cities.

Koshien Stadium is the oldest ballpark in Japan; built in 1924, the stadium was once visited by American baseball legend Babe Ruth on a tour of Major League stars in 1934. There is a monument commemorating this visit within the stadium grounds, in an area called Mizuno Square.

Koshien is revered as a "sacred" ballpark, and players traditionally bow before entering and before leaving its hallowed field. The stadium hosts the annual Japanese High School Baseball Championship in the summer and Japanese High School Baseball Invitational Tournament in the spring. The losing team in any high school baseball game played at the ballpark is allowed to scoop up handfuls of Koshien infield dirt, stuffing holy soil into their cleat bags as hordes of Japanese media snap photos at arm's length.

Curse of the Colonel

As with many other underachieving baseball teams, a curse is believed to lurk over the Tigers. After their 1985 Japan Series win, fans celebrated by having people who looked like Tigers players jump into the Dōtonbori Canal. According to legend, because none of the fans resembled first baseman Randy Bass, fans grabbed a life-sized statue of Kentucky Fried Chicken mascot Colonel Sanders and threw it into the river (like Bass, the Colonel had a beard and was not Japanese). After many seasons without a pennant win, the Tigers were said to be doomed never to win the season again until the Colonel was rescued from the river.

In 2003, when the Tigers returned to the Japan Series after 18 years with the best record in the Central League, many KFC outlets in Kōbe and Ōsaka moved their Colonel Sanders statues inside until the series was over to protect them from Tigers fans.

The top half of the statue (excluding both hands) was finally recovered on March 10, 2009, and the bottom half and right hand shortly after, in the canal by construction workers while constructing a new boardwalk area as part of a beautification project. The statue is still missing its left hand and glasses. The KFC outlet where this statue once stood has since closed; the statue is now at the KFC headquarters in Yokohama. It is not viewable by the public; only employees and special guests are permitted to gaze into the rescued Colonel's eyes. Since then, the Hanshin Tigers made the 2014 Japan Series, but lost to the Fukuoka SoftBank Hawks in 5 games.

Fandom

Tigers fans are known as perhaps the most fanatical and dedicated fans in all of Japanese professional baseball. They often outnumber the home team fans at Tigers "away" games. Tigers fans also once had a reputation for rough behavior and a willingness to brawl with other fans or with each other, although fights are rare these days.

A famous Tigers fan tradition (done by other teams of NPB as well) is the release, by the fans, of hundreds of air-filled balloons immediately following the seventh-inning stretch and the singing of the Tigers' fight song. This tradition is carried out at all home and away games, except at games against the Yomiuri Giants in the Tokyo Dome due to the Giants' notoriously authoritarian and heavy-handed rules for controlling behavior by visiting fans.

The Tigers-Giants rivalry is considered the national Japanese rivalry, on par with the San Francisco Giants vs Los Angeles Dodgers and the Yankees–Red Sox rivalry in Major League Baseball or Real Madrid vs. FC Barcelona in Spanish football.

Fight song 
It is the official fight song of the Tigers. In Japan, wind which blows down from a mountain is known to be cold and harsh, hence the song symbolizes the Tiger's brave challenge under hardship. The song can even be found on karaoke boxes.

Season-by-season
From the  guidebook.

Regular season records

NOTE: The 1944 Japanese Baseball League season was cut-short, the 1945 season was cancelled due to the ongoing war (World War II) with many players being enlisted to fight, and the 2020 Nippon Professional Baseball season was cut short due to the COVID-19 pandemic.

List of managers

Players of note

Current roster

Former players

 

 

 (藤田 平)

 

 (掛布 雅之) – IF 

 (亀山 努, 亀山 つとむ) – OF

Retired numbers

MLB Players

Kenji Johjima (2006-2009)
Ryan Vogelsong (2000–2006, 2011–2017)
Tsuyoshi Shinjo (2001–2003)
Keiichi Yabu (2005, 2008)
Cecil Fielder (1989)
Glenn Davis (1984–1993)
Chris Oxspring (2005)
Kei Igawa (2007–2010)
Marvell Wynne (1983–1990)
Craig Worthington (1988–1992, 1995–1996)
Jeff Williams (1999–2002)
Marc Valdes (1995–1998, 2000–2001)
Tony Tarasco (1993–1999, 2002)
Jerrod Riggan (2000–2003)
Alonzo Powell (1987, 1991)
Matt Murton (2005–2009)
Leon McFadden (1972)
Seung-hwan Oh (2016–2019)
Kyuji Fujikawa (2013-15)
Pierce Johnson (2020-present)
Robert Suarez (2022-present)

Media relating to the Tigers

Mascots
 is a mascot character of the Tigers. With his girlfriend Lucky, he entertains spectators at team games. His uniform number is 1985, because his first appearance was in 1985. His name is a combination of two separate Japanese words, meaning tiger and  meaning lucky. His name therefore means "lucky tiger" in Japanese.

To Lucky's first appearance was on the screen at Hanshin Koshien Stadium in 1985. He appeared as a live-action character in 1987. His design was updated in 1992.

Aside from To-Lucky, the other mascots of the Tigers are Lucky ( ラッキー  Rakkii), his girlfriend, and the most recent addition, Keeta (キー太), Lucky's little brother. Keeta's uniform number is 2011, because he was introduced to the Tigers in 2011. He wears a backwards cap. Lucky's cap is pink unlike her boyfriend's and nephew's.

Newspapers
Daily Sports (デイリースポーツ, published by the Kobe Shimbun, except Hiroshima region)
Nikkan Sports (日刊スポーツ, affiliated company of the Asahi Shimbun, Kansai region)
Sankei Sports (サンケイスポーツ, published by the Sankei Shimbun Osaka Head Office)
Sports Nippon (スポーツニッポン, affiliated company of the Mainichi Shimbun, Kansai region)

Stations
(Broadcasting):
Mainichi Broadcasting System, Inc. (MBS, 毎日放送, Radio and TV)
Asahi Broadcasting Corporation (ABC, 朝日放送, Radio and TV)
Kansai Telecasting Corporation (関西テレビ, TV)
Yomiuri Telecasting Corporation (読売テレビ, TV)
Television Osaka, Inc. (テレビ大阪, TV)
SUN-TV (サンテレビ, TV)

See also
Central League
Western League
Hankyu Hanshin Toho Group – Hanshin Electric Railway Co., Ltd.
Tampere Tigers

References

External links

Hanshin Tigers official website 
Suicide Spurs Reflections on Japanese Baseball – The New York Times
Appetite for Hanshin - Hanshin Tigers English news website

 
Baseball teams established in 1935
Nippon Professional Baseball teams
1935 establishments in Japan
Hankyu Hanshin Holdings